Adam Ryszard Ledwoń (January 15, 1974 – June 11, 2008) was a Polish professional footballer who played as a midfielder.

Career
Ledwoń was born in Olesno, Upper Silesia, Poland.

He played for Bayer 04 Leverkusen (1997–1999), Fortuna Köln (1999–2000), Austria Wien (2000–2003), VfB Admira Wacker Mödling (2003–2005), Sturm Graz (2005–2007). The last club for which he played for was the Austrian team, SK Austria Kärnten. He played 18 matches for the Poland national team, scoring one goal.

Death
Ledwoń was found hanged at his home in Klagenfurt in June 2008.

References

External links
 
 

1974 births
2008 suicides
Sportspeople from Opole Voivodeship
Association football midfielders
People from Olesno
Polish footballers
Poland international footballers
Odra Opole players
GKS Katowice players
Bayer 04 Leverkusen players
SC Fortuna Köln players
FK Austria Wien players
FC Admira Wacker Mödling players
SK Sturm Graz players
SK Austria Kärnten players
Ekstraklasa players
Bundesliga players
2. Bundesliga players
Austrian Football Bundesliga players
Polish expatriate footballers
Expatriate footballers in Germany
Polish expatriate sportspeople in Germany
Expatriate footballers in Austria
Polish expatriate sportspeople in Austria
Suicides by hanging in Austria